Jennifer Rush (born Heidi Stern; September 28, 1960) is an American pop and rock singer. She achieved success during the mid-1980s with several singles and studio albums including the million-selling single "The Power of Love", which she co-wrote and released in 1984. Her greatest success came in Europe, particularly Germany.

Early life
Rush was born Heidi Stern in the New York City borough of Queens and has two older brothers. Her father, Maurice Stern, is an operatic tenor, voice teacher, and sculptor. Her parents divorced, and she and her brothers lived with their mother only until Rush was a toddler, and then with their father and his second wife on the Upper West Side of the borough of Manhattan. Rush studied violin at the Juilliard School and also took play lessons, although she did not enjoy these instruments and instead took to playing the guitar in private. When Rush was nine, the Stern family moved to Germany. They returned to the United States when she was a teenager. She also lived for a time in Seattle, Washington when her father was a professor of voice at the University of Washington.

Career
Rush's debut studio album, titled with her legal name of Heidi Stern, was released locally in Seattle, Washington in 1979. After meeting singer, songwriter, and producer Gene McDaniels in Seattle, she flew to LA to record demo songs with him. She credits McDaniels as being her first and most influential mentor as a songwriter and a singer. In 1982, following McDaniels's persistence, Rush moved to Wiesbaden, Germany, where her father was engaged as an opera singer.

It was the co-written single "The Power of Love", the fifth and last single release from her debut studio album, that became the biggest selling single of 1985 in the United Kingdom, as well as becoming a significant hit in Australia, Ireland, Canada, Denmark, France, Germany, Italy, Japan, Norway, Portugal, South Africa, and Sweden, and was listed in the Guinness Book of World Records at the time  as the best-selling single by a female solo artist in the history of the British music industry. "The Power of Love" held that status until 1992, when it was outsold by Whitney Houston's "I Will Always Love You".

"The Power of Love" reached number one for several weeks in Australia, South Africa and numerous European countries. Though it reached number one or the top ten in several other countries, Rush's version peaked at number 57 on the US Billboard Hot 100 chart. After several cover versions by other acts, Celine Dion's version made a US chart impact in 1994, reaching number one in the US, as well as number one in Canada and Australia.

Rush remained successful singing in both English and Spanish, where her next two albums reached number 1 for 14 weeks and 9 weeks respectively. In the UK, three of her albums reached the top 50 in the albums chart. Her third studio album Heart over Mind (1987), featuring compositions by Desmond Child, Michael Bolton, and Diane Warren, and guitar work from Richie Sambora of Bon Jovi, brought her Top 40 success in her home country, with "Flames of Paradise", a duet with Elton John. She also recorded duets with Michael Bolton, Plácido Domingo and Brian May.

Rush co-wrote several of the songs on her albums with her record producers including Desmond Child, Phil Ramone, Michael J. Powell, Christopher Neil, and Diane Warren.

Through the 1990s, Rush released four albums, the last being 1998's Classics, along with new songs, and also re-recording some of her biggest hits with the Hungarian Philharmonic Orchestra. After that she took some time off in New York, dedicating time to her daughter, who was born in 1993. 

By the late 1990s, Rush had hit the US Hot 100 chart two times; "The Power of Love" reaching number 57 in 1985 and "Flames of Paradise" (a duet with Elton John) reaching number 36 in 1987. She publicly acknowledged that being less known as a singer in the United States, unlike her celebrity in Europe, allowed her to raise her daughter in the US with a more stable and somewhat private environment. She could still travel and perform, but also enjoyed the luxury of songwriting with colleagues based on the East Coast and being available to her daughter as a single mother. A series of greatest-hits compilation albums comprising most of her European hit songs followed in the 2000s.

A box set titled Stronghold – The Collector's Hit Box was released in August 2007. This compilation included all of Rush's singles from 1982 to 1991 (with the first record company that signed her), and in their extended versions as available. It also included all the B-sides and other rare or unreleased tracks (among them four James Bond theme songs, recorded live in 1984 and only released in a very limited edition by the Berlin Philharmonic).

In March 2009, she announced on her official website that she had signed a recording contract with Sony Music/Ariola for one album. That album would be Now Is the Hour, released in 2010. This marked a return to the recording label where she had made her international breakthrough in the 1980s and on which she had released the first five studio albums of her career. Now Is the Hour was released on March 5, 2010, in most of Europe, and on March 8, 2010, in the UK. The album failed to chart in the US or the UK, but reached number twenty-one on the German Albums chart.

Discography

Studio albums
 Heidi (1979) (as Heidi Stern)
 Tonight (1982) (as Heidi Stern)
 Jennifer Rush (1984)
 Jennifer Rush: International Version (1985)
 Movin' (1985)
 Heart over Mind (1987)
 Passion (1988)
 Wings of Desire (1989)
 Jennifer Rush (1992)
 Out of My Hands (1995)
 Credo (1997)
 Classics (1998)
 Now Is the Hour (2010)

References

External links

 Official website
 
 
 

 
1960 births
Living people
20th-century American singers
21st-century American singers
20th-century American women singers
21st-century American women singers
People from Queens, New York
American expatriates in the United Kingdom
American expatriates in Germany
American women singer-songwriters
American mezzo-sopranos
American women pop singers
20th-century American Jews
American rock songwriters
American women rock singers
Singer-songwriters from New York (state)
Jewish singers
American people of Jewish descent
People from the Upper West Side
21st-century American Jews